St. Edward's Hall (also referred to as St. Ed's or Steds) is one of the 32 Residence Halls on the campus of the University of Notre Dame and one of sixteen male dormitories. Saint Edward's Hall is located directly east of the Main Administration Building and is directly west of Zahm Hall and houses 162 undergraduate students. The structure, the oldest among all residence halls on campus, was built in 1882 to house the minims, Notre Dame's boarding school program. When such program was discontinued in 1929, the building was converted to an undergraduate residence hall, which it has been ever since. Together with other historical structures of the university, it is on the National Register of Historic Places. The coat of arms is the Cross of Saint Edward the Confessor on a green background.

History

Matthew J. Walsh decided to build Saint Edward's Hall  in 1882 to house the boarding school for the minims program, ages six to thirteen, which was growing and reached a population of a 100 in 1883. The hall was designed by Charles Harding, C.S.C, in Notre Dame yellow brick in French style, with a Mansard roof and named after Edward Sorin's patron saint. The cornerstone was laid on 20 April 1882 by Sorin himself. It had dormitories, classrooms, recreation rooms, refectory, and a manicured lawn in front of the building. An annex was built on the east side of the hall in 1898 to make room for a gym, a roller skating rink, and more classrooms. In 1925, Knute Rockne received his First Holy Communion in the Chapel of Saint Edward the Confessor.   

In 1929 president Charles L. O’Donnell decided to abandon the boarding school program, and the hall was converted into an undergraduate residence hall (since the college population was growing and space badly needed) under the direction of professor and architect Vincent Fagan in June 1929.  The open dormitory was converted into double rooms, while the chapel was left untouched, and it opened in September to house 207 undergraduates. The hall's first rector was Raymond Clancy, C.S.C. The building annex was demolished to make space for Zahm Hall in 1937. The facade received minor renovations in 1976.  

On 25 June 1980 when a fire broke out around 9 AM and engulfed the roof and the fourth floor of the building, likely caused by workers who were installing a sprinkler system. Four firemen were injured in fighting the blaze and the fire was put out by 11:30 AM. No students were in the building since the semester had ended, and the only resident was the rector Fr. Mario Pedi. The fire resulted in extensive damage, although the Luigi Gregori fresco on the second floor and the stained glass windows were saved. The university decided to restore the hall (which was 98 years old art the time) instead of demolishing and building a new one, and reconstruction started on October 1st. While the hall was being rebuilt, the 124 residents of St. Edward's had to be assigned to makeshift housing in portions of Grace, Flanner, and Columba Halls. The intramural teams for the hall were kept during that time, in order to maintain hall spirit alive. During reconstruction, the two story, detached annex to the north was torn down, and replaced by a four-story addition in style matching the rest of the hall with a French mansard roof. The addition gave the building its current L shape. The old annex, while not damaged by the fire, was in poor state. The renovated building, which featured expanded social and study spaces, improved stairwells, and an elevator, housed 187 students compared to the 134 before the fire. The cost of the project was 2 million dollars, 1 million of which had come from insurance.

Saint Edward's Hall's signature annual event is Founder's Week. It is celebrated during the week of October 13 and it includes a badminton tournament, historical lectures, a festival in St. Edward's Park, and a special dormitory Mass. There is also an annual spring excursion to Chicago, the Yacht Dance, in which the Gentlemen take part in a dance aboard a chartered yacht. St. Ed's main dorm rivalry is with  Sorin Hall.

Fr. Ralph Haag, C.S.C., is the current rector of Saint Edward's Hall.

Description

The building is in Second Empire style.  

The Chapel of St. Edward the Confessor contains eight stained glass windows depicting various saints, Saints Edward, Anthony, and Andrew, while the other five show scenes from the life of Jesus. The glass was produced by the Carmelite stained glass atelier in Le Mans. Two were designed by Eugène Hucher and sons studios 1888 and four by his student Albert Echivard in 1912. The same French company also completed a large stained glass portrait of the University's founder Father Edward Sorin, which is found in the central stairwell. In addition, St. Edward's second floor has a mural by the Vatican muralist Luigi Gregori, whose work also adorns the Main Building, and the Basilica of the Sacred Heart. The mural depicts a meeting between Father Sorin and the local Native Americans at the founding of the University in 1842. The residence hall is the oldest building on campus currently in use as an undergraduate dormitory, and its original wing is constructed of the signature yellow bricks dredged by Holy Cross religious from the marl found in the University's two lakes.

Notable residents
 John Carlson - Arizona Cardinals tight end
 Jimmy Clausen - Notre Dame football quarterback
Pat Connaughton - Milwaukee Bucks shooting guard
 Phil Donahue - talk show host
 Ryan Grant - Green Bay Packers running back
 Tim Grunhard - Kansas City Chiefs center
 Dan Hesse - CEO of Sprint
 Paul Hornung - Heisman Trophy winner
 Sadoluwa "Dolu" Lanlehin - Nigerian prince
 Chris Thomas - professional basketball player
 Monty Williams - professional basketball player/coach

See also
 National Register of Historic Places listings in St. Joseph County, Indiana

Notes

References
 
 Irish Legends
 St. Edward's Hall Profile
 Notre Dame Magazine - Hall Portrait: Saint Edward's

External links
 St. Edward's Hall Website
 St. Edward's Hall Profile at the Office of Residence Life and Housing
 University of Notre Dame Website
 South Bend aTribune Article on the Hall
 Notre Dame Archives Article
 Records of the History of the Hall
Picture of St. Edwards before the 1980 Fire | South Bend Tribune

1882 establishments in Indiana
National Register of Historic Places in St. Joseph County, Indiana
University and college buildings completed in 1882
University of Notre Dame residence halls
Historic district contributing properties in Indiana
University and college buildings on the National Register of Historic Places in Indiana